Home Is the Hero is a 1959 Irish drama film directed by Fielder Cook. It was entered into the 9th Berlin International Film Festival.

Cast
 Walter Macken – Paddo O'Reilly
 Eileen Crowe – Daylia O'Reilly
 Arthur Kennedy – Willie O'Reilly
 Joan O'Hara – Josie O'Reilly
 Maire O'Donnell – Maura Green
 Harry Brogan – Dovetail
 Maire Keane – Bid
 Philip O'Flynn – Trapper
 Pat Layde – Mr. Green
 Eddie Golden – Mr. Shannon
 John Hoey – Finnegan
 Michael C. Hennessy – Manchester Monaghan
 Michael O'Brian – 1st Pub Customer
 Dermot Kelly – 2nd Pub Customer

References

External links

1959 films
English-language Irish films
1959 drama films
Irish black-and-white films
Films directed by Fielder Cook
1950s English-language films